Avtar Kishan Hangal (1 February 1914 – 26 August 2012) was an Indian freedom fighter from 1929 to 1947 and also stage actor from 1936 to 1965 and later became a character actor in Hindi language films from 1966 to 2005. His most notable roles are as Ram Shastri in Aaina (1977), as the Inder Sen in Shaukeen, as Bipinlal Pandey in Namak Haraam, as Imaam Saa'b in Sholay, as Anokhelal in Manzil and the antagonist in Prem Bandhan and the 16 films he did with Rajesh Khanna. He has acted in around 225 Hindi films in a career spanning from 1966 to 2005.

Early life 
Avtar Kishan Hangal was born in Sialkot in the Punjab Province of British India (now in Punjab, Pakistan) into a Kashmiri Pandit family, he spent his childhood and youth in Peshawar, North-West Frontier Province where he had performed in theatre for some major roles. His family home was inside Reti Gate as mentioned in his memoirs. His father's name was Pandit Hari Kishan Hangal. His mother's name was Ragia Hundoo. He had two sisters. Bishan and Kishan. He was married to Manorma Dar from Agra. However, his primary occupation for the early part of his life was that of a tailor. He was an active participant in the Indian freedom struggle from 1929 to 1947. He joined Shree Sangeet Priya Mandal, a theatre group in Peshawar in 1936 and continued to act in many plays in undivided India till 1946. Following his father's retirement, the family moved from Peshawar to Karachi. He moved to Bombay after the Partition of India in 1949 after 3 years in prison in Pakistan. He was involved with the theatre group IPTA along with Balraj Sahni and Kaifi Azmi, both of whom had Marxist leanings. He was jailed because he was a communist in Karachi for two years from 1947 to 1949 and after his release came to India and settled in Mumbai. He later acted in many plays in theatres in India from 1949 to 1965.

Hindi cinema career
He started his Hindi film career at the age of 52 with Basu Bhattacharya's Teesri Kasam in 1966 and Shagird, and went on to play as the man of principles playing the on-screen father or uncle of the leading men/women in the films in the 1970s, 1980s and 1990s, or sometimes the quintessential meek and oppressed old man. His pivotal roles in the films such as Chetan Anand's Heer Raanjha, Namak Haraam, Shaukeen (1981), Sholay, Aaina (1977), Avtaar, Arjun, Aandhi, Tapasya, Kora Kagaz, Bawarchi, Chhupa Rustam, Chitchor, Balika Badhu, Guddi and Naram Garam are considered to be among his best. He, as a character actor was part of 16 films with Rajesh Khanna as the lead hero, like Aap Ki Kasam, Amar Deep, Naukri,  Prem Bandhan, Thodisi Bewafaii, Phir Wohi Raat, Kudrat, Aaj Ka M.L.A. Ram Avtar, Bewafai until Sautela Bhai in 1996. His best performances in his later years was in  Shararat (2002) his character roles in Tere Mere Sapne (1997) and Lagaan. In movies he has played a very large number of character roles, mostly positive, with rare exceptions where his negative roles became famous, like in Manzil and Prem Bandhan. He also acted in a NFDC film, DATTAK (The Adopted), directed by Gul Bahar Singh in 2001.
Producer Debika Mitra had signed Madan Puri for Inder Sen's role, but a friend advised that A. K. Hangal would be a better choice. The superlative performance went on to become one of the most cherished acts of Hangal.

On 8 February 2011, Hangal 'walked' the ramp in a wheelchair for fashion designer Riyaz Ganji for his summer line in Mumbai.

Hangal made his last appearance in the television series Madhubala – Ek Ishq Ek Junoon in May 2012, in which he had a cameo. Madhubala – Ek Ishq Ek Junoon was a tribute to 100 years of Indian cinema. The episode that featured Hangal aired on 1 June at 22:00 on Colors. In the early 2012, Hangal also gave his voice for the character of King Ugrasen in the animation film Krishna Aur Kans which was released on 3 August 2012. This was final work in his career before his death. His portrayal of Ugrasen was much appreciated by critics.

Awards
The government of India awarded him the Padma Bhushan for his contribution to Hindi Cinema in 2006.

Health and financial issues

Hangal, who had more than 200 films to his credit in a career that spanned nearly five decades, due to his old age post 2007 found it difficult to meet his medical expenses. His son Vijay, a retired cameraman and former Bollywood photographer, himself is 75 and has not had a full-time job since 2001. As a result, the family had financial difficulties. Though previously Vijay would take up small jobs, but later he suffered from back problems and was unable to work. After 2007, Hangal has been suffering from an illness  and could not afford the treatment. At this point, following a media spotlight on 20 January 2011, many film stars and directors promised to help him financially. Maharashtra Chief Minister Prithviraj Chavan also pledged to assist the veteran actor. Before that, Maharashtra Navnirman Sena activists visited Hangal at his home and offered him medical and financial help. They also provided revitalization of memories of veteran's work and made media report it. Upon asking, Raj Thackeray expressed his concerns towards such actors who are neglected in their old age.

The actor had last shot for Amol Palekar's film, Paheli in 2005. In fact, he had not gone out of his house for the last eight months. "We were surprised to see him get out of home. He would have done it only for acting," said his son Vijay and added, "My father had remained at home for the past few months. The show producer Saurabh Tiwari and senior executives from the channel came to our place to offer him the role. Several filmmakers had approached him in the last few years. But father did not take those up due to health issues."

A. K. Hangal returned to face the studio lights after seven long years. Having reached the sets of a TV Series Madhubala - Ek Ishq Ek Junoon on a wheelchair, the then 97-year-old actor wasn't sure he would be able to handle it physically. But once the cameras started rolling, there was no stopping the actor within.

Freedom fighter
Hangal participated in the Indian freedom movement when as a student, he joined protests in the North West Frontier Province against the massacre at Jallianwala Bagh. He later moved to Karachi, where he spent three years in prison for protesting against British rule.
He is also related to India's first Prime Minister, Pt. Jawahar Lal Nehru. Jawahar's wife, Kamla Nehru, was first cousin of A. K. Hangal's mother.

Death
Hangal was admitted to the Asha Parekh Hospital in Santa Cruz, Mumbai on 16 August 2012, three days after he fractured his thigh bone from a fall in his bathroom. His son said that he went to the hospital as he had "suffered a back injury and had to undergo a surgery. But that could not take place as later it was found that he has chest and breathing problems." On 26 August, he was put on life support. Dr Vinod Khanna, an orthopaedic surgeon at the hospital said: "He is on life support system. One of his lungs is not functioning. He is also having respiratory problems." But, his condition worsened and he died on the same day, at the age of 98. His cremation was held the next afternoon at Pavan Hans crematorium.

In reaction to his death, Shabana Azmi wrote on Twitter: "An era comes to an end. Theatre and film were enriched by him." The Communist Party of India described Hangal as a committed social and political activist who withstood the Shiv Sena onslaught. The BJP's L. K. Advani and Nitin Gadkari also condoled his death.

Filmography

Films

TV series

Works
 Life and Times of A.K. Hangal (1999) (Autobiography)

References

External links

 
 The genial revolutionary. Rediff.com.
 Marxist who made it good in movies  The Hindu.
 Some pictures of him at the 'Mid-Day'
 

Male actors from Punjab, India
Indian male film actors
1917 births
2012 deaths
People from Sialkot
Indian people of Kashmiri descent
Kashmiri people
Kashmiri Pandits
Kashmiri Brahmins
Male actors in Hindi cinema
Male actors from Mumbai
Indian male stage actors
Indian male television actors
Recipients of the Padma Bhushan in arts
Indian People's Theatre Association people
20th-century Indian male actors